Columbia Manufacturing Inc. is a company located in Westfield, Massachusetts that manufactures chairs, desks, and other materials. In the education industry, it is best known for making the desk chair Model 114, which is used all over the nation. Founded in 1877, it was once owned by Pope Manufacturing Company and was the brand that manufactured bicycles for the company. After Pope filed for bankruptcy in 1915, Columbia continued on to manufacture bicycles in Westfield. As of the 2010s, Columbia-branded bicycles are marketed by Columbia Bicycles, a subsidiary of Ballard Pacific.

References

External links
 Company website

Furniture companies of the United States
Cycle manufacturers of the United States
American companies established in 1877
Companies based in Hampden County, Massachusetts
Westfield, Massachusetts